The  2018 Daventry District Council election were held on Thursday 3 May 2018 to elect members of Daventry District Council in England.This was on the same day as other local elections.
 
This was to be the final elections for Daventry District Council due to the poor running of Northamptonshire County Council by the local Conservative Party leading to new unitary authorities for the county being proposed. The Caller Report into the running of Northamptonshire County Council suggested that any elections currently scheduled for 2019 be abandoned and elections for the new authorities held in May 2020.

The make up of the council after the elections was 30 Conservative councillors, 5 Labour councillors and 1 Liberal Democrat councillor.

Election result

Ward results

Abbey North

Abbey South

Brixworth

Drayton

Hill

Long Buckby

Moulton

Spratton

Weedon

Welford

Woodford

Yelvertoft

References

2018
2018 English local elections
2010s in Northamptonshire